The 2021–22 REMA 1000-ligaen is the 55th season of REMA 1000-ligaen, Norway's premier handball league.

Team information 
A total of 14 teams will be participating in the 2021/22 edition of REMA 1000-ligaen. 13 teams were qualified directly from the 2020/21 season, as no team was relegated last season due to the COVID-19 pandemic. Only Follo HK from 1. divisjon, was promoted to REMA 1000-ligaen.

Regular season
This season, the three teams placing 12th, 13th and 14th will be relegated to the 1. divisjon, and the teams placing 9th, 10th and 11th will have to play a relegation playoff tournament.

Standings

Results
In the table below the home teams are listed on the left and the away teams along the top.

Championship play-offs
Best of three format is applied in all play-off stages, with the higher seeded team playing the second and third game (if necessary) at home. If a game ended with a draw after the regular time, it will proceed to two 5-minutes periods of extra time. If there is still a draw, another 2 × 5-minutes extra time will be played. If the scores are still level after two extra times, the winners are decided by a 7-meter shootout.

Top ranked teams from the regular season choose their opponents in the quarterfinal and semifinal stages. The remaining two highest ranked teams after the quarterfinal stage can not meet in the semifinals.

Bracket

Quarterfinals

Vipers Kristiansand won series, 2–0.

Molde Elite won series, 2–1.

Storhamar Elite won series, 2–0.

Sola Håndballklubb won series, 2–1.

Semifinals

Vipers Kristiansand won series, 2–0.

Storhamar Elite won series, 2–0.

Finals

Vipers Kristiansand won series, 2–0.

Awards

All Star Team and other awards 
The All Star Team and other awards were announced on 8 June 2022.

Season statistics

Top goalscorers

Relegation play-off tournament
To determine the last available spot in REMA 1000-ligaen, play-off matches are played between the teams that ended as 9th, 10th and 11th in REMA 1000-ligaen's regular season and the teams who finished 2nd, 3rd and 4th in the 1. divisjon. Double league matches are played, and the two best teams in the REMA 1000-ligaen play-off will remain in the league. The team who finish last in the REMA 1000-ligaen play-off head face to face with the winner of the teams from the First division play-off, in two final qualifying matches.

Standings, REMA 1000-ligaen play-off

Results, REMA 1000-ligaen play-off

Standings, First Division play-off

Results, First Division play-off

Finale, REMA 1000-ligaen play-off

Tertnes Håndball Elite won series 2–1, and avoided from the relegation.

References

Notes

External links
 Norwegian Handball Federaration 

Eliteserien
Eliteserien
Eliteserien